Johnny St. Cyr (April 17, 1890 – June 17, 1966) was an American jazz banjoist and guitarist. For banjo his by far most used type in records at least was the six string one. On a famous “action photo” with Jelly Roll Morton’s Red Hot Peppers he is holding a four string banjo, probably tenor. There is, however, no verified information if he ever used such an instrument on records. 

St. Cyr was born in New Orleans, Louisiana and raised Catholic. He played for several leading New Orleans bands before moving to Chicago in 1923. He is best remembered as a member of Louis Armstrong's Hot Five and Hot Seven bands. He also played with Jelly Roll Morton's Red Hot Peppers. He composed the standard "Oriental Strut", known for its adventurous chord sequence.

During the 1950s, he performed and led a group named Johnny St. Cyr and His Hot Five and recorded with Paul Barbarin and George Lewis. From 1961 until his death in 1966, St. Cyr was the bandleader of the Young Men from New Orleans, who performed at Disneyland. He died in Los Angeles, California, and is buried in Evergreen Cemetery, in Los Angeles.

See also

 Banjo Hall of Fame Members

References

External links
 
 Jazz As I Remember It, St. Cyr's autobiography
 
 

1890 births
1966 deaths
American jazz bandleaders
American jazz banjoists
American jazz guitarists
American banjoists
African-American banjoists
African-American guitarists
Burials at Evergreen Cemetery, Los Angeles
20th-century American musicians
Guitarists from Louisiana
American male guitarists
20th-century guitarists
20th-century American male musicians
American male jazz musicians
Jazz musicians from New Orleans
New Orleans Wanderers members
Red Hot Peppers members
Louis Armstrong and His Hot Five members
Louis Armstrong and His Hot Seven members
Southland Records artists
20th-century African-American musicians
Converts to Methodism from Roman Catholicism